Karen Price (née Hill; born 7 May 1955) is a former New South Wales Breakers and Australia Women's cricketer. A right-handed batsman and right-arm fast-medium bowler, Price played List-A cricket for the Breakers between 1972 and 1987, and Test cricket from 1975 to 1985. Price was an all-rounder, with both a Test century and five-wicket haul to her name. She took 6/72 against India on 28 January 1984, and scored 104* in the following Test on 3 February. She was less successful with the bat in the one day game, scoring only 94 runs from 23 matches at 6.26, however she was as equal with the ball as she was in Tests: 29 wickets at 16.51.

References

External links
 
 Karen Price at southernstars.org.au

1955 births
Sportswomen from New South Wales
Australia women Test cricketers
Australia women One Day International cricketers
New South Wales Breakers cricketers
Living people
Cricketers from Sydney